Stanley Szukala (June 12, 1918 – October 30, 2003) was an American basketball player.  He was an All-American college player at DePaul University and played for four seasons in the American National Basketball League (NBL), a forerunner to the National Basketball Association (NBA).  He was a member of the 1947 NBL champion Chicago American Gears, playing alongside future Hall of Fame center George Mikan.

References

External links
NBL stats

1918 births
2003 deaths
All-American college men's basketball players
American men's basketball players
Basketball players from Chicago
Chicago American Gears players
Chicago Bruins players
DePaul Blue Demons men's basketball players
Guards (basketball)
Carl Schurz High School alumni